Larry Ochs (born May 3, 1949 in New York City) is an American jazz saxophonist, co-founder of the Rova Saxophone Quartet and Metalanguage Records.

Ochs studied trumpet briefly but concentrated on tenor and sopranino saxophones. He worked as a record producer and founded his own label, Metalanguage Records in 1978, in addition to operating the Twelve Stars  studio in California. He co-founded the Rova Saxophone Quartet and worked in Glenn Spearman's Double Trio. A frequent recipient of commissions, he composed the music for the play Goya's L.A. by Leslie Scalapino in 1994 and for the film Letters Not About Love, which was named best documentary at SXSW in 1998. He has played in a new music trio called Room and the What We Live ensemble. He has recorded several albums as a leader. He formed the group Kihnoua in 2007 with vocalist Dohee Lee and Scott Amendola on drums and electronics, which released Unauthorized Caprices in 2010.

He is married to poet Lyn Hejinian.

Discography
 Hall of Mirrors, Room (Music & Arts, 1992)
 The Secret Magritte (Black Saint, 1995)
 The Neon Truth (Black Saint, 2002)
 Fly Fly Fly (Intakt, 2004) with Joan Jeanrenaud, Miya Masaoka
 Out Trios Vol.5: Up from Under (Atavistic, 2007)
 The Mirror World (Metalanguage, 2007)
 Spiller Alley (RogueArt, 2008)
 Stone Shift (RogueArt, 2009)
 We All Feel the Same Way, Jones Jones  (SoLyd, 2009)
 Unauthorized Caprices (Not Two, 2010)
 The Throne (Not Two, 2014) with Don Robinson
 The Fictive Five (Tzadik, 2015)

With Rova Saxophone Quartet
 1978 The Bay
 1978 Cinema Rovaté  
 1979 Daredevils 
 1979 The Removal of Secrecy
 1979 This, This, This, This
 1981 As Was
 1984 Plays Lacy-Favorite Street 
 1985 The Crowd-For Elias Canetti 
 1987 Beat Kennel
 1989 Electric Rags II 
 1991 Long on Logic 
 1989 This Time We Are Both 
 1992 From the Bureau of Both
 1994 Terry Riley: Chanting the Light of Foresight 
 1995 John Coltrane's Ascension 
 1995 The Works Vol. 1 
 1996 Ptow!! 
 1996 The Works Vol. 2 
 1996 Totally Spinning  
 1998 Morphological Echo 
 1998 Bingo
 1999 The Works Vol. 3 
 2003 Resistance 
 2005 Electric Ascension 
 2007 The Juke Box Suite 
 2012 A Short History

With Glenn Spearman
 1992 Mystery Project
 1993 Smokehouse
 1996 The Fields
 1997 Blues for Falasha

With Fred Frith and Maybe Monday
 Digital Wildlife (Winter & Winter, 2002)
 Unsquare (Intakt, 2008)

With Dave Rempis and Darren Johnston
 Spectral (Aerophonic, 2014)

References

External links
Interview by Luke Harley, 27 May 2008 at Paris Transatlantic

American jazz composers
American male jazz composers
American jazz saxophonists
American male saxophonists
Musicians from New York (state)
Living people
1949 births
21st-century American saxophonists
21st-century American male musicians
Atavistic Records artists
Black Saint/Soul Note artists
Music & Arts artists
Intakt Records artists
RogueArt artists